There are over 20,000 Grade II* listed buildings in England. This page is a list of these buildings in the district of South Oxfordshire in Oxfordshire.

South Oxfordshire

|}

Notes

External links

 
Lists of listed buildings in Oxfordshire
South Oxfordshire District